Givira binubila is a moth in the family Cossidae. It is found in Guyana.

References

Natural History Museum Lepidoptera generic names catalog

Givira
Moths described in 1916